Michael Tiddes is an American film director and producer, best known for directing A Haunted House and A Haunted House 2.

Career 
In 2013, Tiddes made his feature film directing debut with the horror comedy film A Haunted House, based on the script by Marlon Wayans and Rick Alvarez. The film was released domestically on January 11, 2013 by Open Road Films, and grossed more than $60 million with a budget of just $2.5 million.

In 2014, Tiddes directed the sequel to his first film, A Haunted House 2, based on the script by Wayans and Alvarez. The film was released domestically on April 18, 2014 by Open Road, grossing $24 million with a budget of just $4 million.

Tiddes directed another spoof film, Fifty Shades of Black, again scripted by Wayans and Alvarez. The film was released on January 29, 2016 by Open Road.

Future projects 
In July 2014, Tiddes was hired to direct an action-comedy film Diablo Run based on the 2013 Black List script by Evan and Shea Mirzai, which Mark Canton would produce through his Atmosphere Entertainment along with David Hopwood and Matthew Einstein. Later in November 2014, Voltage Pictures came on board to finance the film, while Voltage's Craig Flores would also produce the film.

Filmography

References

External links 
 

Living people
American film directors
American film producers
Comedy film directors
Parody film directors
American parodists
American screenwriters
Year of birth missing (living people)